Raúl Tiago Soares Almeida (born 2 November 1997) is a Portuguese footballer who plays as a forward.

Career
On 7 August 2016, Almeida made his professional debut with FC Porto B in a 2016–17 LigaPro match against Aves.

References

External links
 
 
 Raúl Almeida at ZeroZero

1997 births
Living people
Portuguese footballers
People from Gondomar, Portugal
Association football forwards
FC Porto players
Gondomar S.C. players
Sporting CP footballers
Boavista F.C. players
F.C. Paços de Ferreira players
FC Porto B players
S.C. Covilhã players
R.D. Águeda players
U.S.C. Paredes players
Liga Portugal 2 players
Campeonato de Portugal (league) players
Sportspeople from Porto District